Mohammed Ahmed Alin Yusuf also known as Tiimbaro is a Somaliland politician, who is currently serving as the Governor of Awdal region since June 2020. He also served as the Governor of Sanaag region of Somaliland from January 2018 to June 2020.

Tiimbaro is currently serving as the Governor of Awdal region of Somaliland since June 2020.

See also

 Governor of Sanaag
 Sanaag Region

References

Living people
Governors of Awdal
Governors of Sanaag
Somaliland politicians
Year of birth missing (living people)